Mattia Marchi (born 14 January 1989) is an Italian former footballer who played as a forward.

Club career

Rimini
Born in Rimini, Romagna, Marchi started his career at hometown club Rimini. In January 2010 he left for Lega Pro 2nd Division club Südtirol, winning the champion of the group A.

Südtirol
Rimini was expelled from professional league in 2010, and Marchi joined Chievo on a free transfer. However, he re-joined Südtirol in co-ownership deal for a peppercorn fee of €500 Südtirol bought Marchi outright for another €500 after he scored 9 goals as team top-scorer.

Virtus Entella
On 14 July 2011 he was signed by Serie A team Novara but re-sold to Pavia on 16 July in another co-ownership deal. He was the joint-topscorer along with Filippo Falco. Marchi also scored once in relegation "play-out" (another goal by Alessandro Cesca), made the club survived from relegation. In June 2012 he returned to Novara and re-sold to Entella on 1 August 2012. In June 2013 Marchi joined Entella outright from Novara for free.

Cremonese
On 25 July 2014 Marchi was signed by Cremonese.

Pavia
On 23 January 2015 Marchi was signed by Pavia.

Reggiana
On 30 July 2019, he signed a 3-year contract with Reggio Audace. On 16 January 2021, he returned to Südtirol on loan.

Virtus Verona
On 31 August 2021, he moved to Virtus Verona on a one-year deal with an extension option.

References

External links
 Südtirol Profile 
 Football.it Profile 
 

1989 births
Living people
Sportspeople from Rimini
Italian footballers
Association football forwards
Serie B players
Serie C players
Rimini F.C. 1912 players
F.C. Südtirol players
F.C. Pavia players
Virtus Entella players
U.S. Cremonese players
Mantova 1911 players
FeralpiSalò players
A.C. Reggiana 1919 players
Virtus Verona players
Footballers from Emilia-Romagna